Rawdat Rashed is a village in Qatar, located in the municipality of Al-Shahaniya. It was demarcated in 1988. It used to be part of the Jariyan Al Batnah municipality before the municipality was incorporated into Al Rayyan. In 2014, the village was incorporated into the newly-created Al-Shahaniya Municipality. The Dhal Al Misfir cave is located in the area.

Etymology
In Arabic, rawdat refers to a depression where rainfall runoff accumulates. The second part of the name, "Rashed", was given in honor of a man named Rashed who died in the rawdat.

Geography
Rawdat Rashed is situated in central Qatar. The villages of Wadi Al Jamal Al Shamali and Umm Wishah are nearby.

Barwa Group launched a planned community named Madinat Al Mawater (literally 'Motor City') on the outskirts of Rawdat Rashed, near the junction of Rawdat Rashed Road–Salwa Road. The community will host residential units, workshops, car showrooms, and apartment complexes.

Industry
The area contains the most substantial supply of fresh groundwater in the southern zone of the country. A government wellfield is found in the area, and was previously used as a water source for Umm Bab's cement industry. 

Rawdat Rashed is also one of five sites for the government-sponsored project to develop reservoirs in the country. Once completed, the reservoirs are expected to be the largest in the world in their category, with a total length of 650 km and constructed at a cost of QR 14.5 billion. Rawdat Rashed's water reservoir is built at 50 ft above sea level, and will be used as the main water supply for the capital of Doha in the scenario of an electricity outage at the other stations. In June 2018, the first phase of the project was completed.

Rawdat Rashed is one of the three major landfill sites in the country, being used mainly for construction and demolition waste.

Transport
Rawdat Rashed Road, a 33 km road stretching through the city connected to Dukhan Highway, which links Dukhan and Doha, is known locally as the 'road of death' due to the large number of fatal accidents which occur on the road. After announcing a redevelopment plan for the road in 2014, the Public Works Authority commenced redevelopment work in 2015. The redevelopment project, due for completion in late 2019, will also link the road with Salwa Road.

References

Populated places in Al-Shahaniya